Gwen Harwood  (née Gwendoline Nessie Foster, 8 June 19205 December 1995) was an Australian poet and librettist. Harwood is regarded as one of Australia's finest poets, publishing over 420 works, including 386 poems and 13 librettos. She won numerous poetry awards and prizes, and one of Australia's most significant poetry prizes, the Gwen Harwood Poetry Prize is named for her. Her work is commonly studied in schools and university courses.

Gwen Harwood was the mother of the author John Harwood.

Life
Harwood was born on 8 June 1920 in Taringa, a suburb of Brisbane. She attended Brisbane Girls Grammar School and was an organist at All Saints' Church when she was young. She completed a music teacher's diploma, and also worked as a typist at the War Damage Commission from 1942. Early in her life, she developed an interest in literature, philosophy and music.

She married linguist Bill Harwood in September 1945, shortly after which they moved to Oyster Cove south of Hobart as he was appointed a lecturer at the University of Tasmania. Here she developed her lifelong interest in the work of philosopher Ludwig Wittgenstein "which informs her entire opus".

Her father played piano, violin, guitar and the flute. Both Gwen and her brother were given piano lessons, and originally Gwen wanted to be a musician. Gwen's grandmother introduced her to poetry; this inspired her and became her lifelong calling and passion.

Literary career
Harwood had written poetry for many years, and her first poem was published in Meanjin in 1944, but her work did not start appearing regularly in journals and books until the 1960s. Her first book of poems, titled Poems, was published in 1963, followed in 1968 by Poems Volume II. Other books include The Lion's Bride (1981), Bone Scan (1988), and The Present Tense (1995). There are also several versions of a Selected Poems, including one from Penguin in 2001.

Harwood used a range of pseudonyms in her early work, such as Walter Lehmann, W. W. Hagendoor (an anagram of her name), Francis Geyer, Timothy (TF) Kline, Miriam Stone, and Alan Carvosso. Most of her poems submitted for publication under her own name were initially rejected. The editor of Meanjin, C. B. Christesen, once rejected a poem from Harwood but used an expression in it ("the freckled shade") as the title of one of his own poems. In 1961 The Bulletin accepted a sonnet from her alter ego Walter Lehmann, but only after it was published was it brought to the attention of the editor, Donald Horne, that the initial letters of each line formed the phrase "FUCK ALL EDITORS". After this, she found much greater acceptance.

She also wrote libretti for composers such as Larry Sitsky, James Penberthy, Don Kay and Ian Cugley.

She corresponded over the years with several poet friends, including Vincent Buckley, A. D. Hope, Vivian Smith, and Norman Talbot, as well as family and other friends such as Tony Riddell, and two volumes of her letters have been published. She served as president of the Tasmanian Branch of the Fellowship of Australian Writers.

Her poetry has been used by many students who are completing the Higher School Certificate (HSC) in New South Wales, Australia, by Victorian Certificate of Education (VCE) students in Victoria, Australia, by the International Baccalaureate (IB) in Australia, and by Western Australian Certificate of Education (WACE) students in Western Australia, Australia.

Literary themes and style
Harwood's poetry has recurring themes of motherhood and the stifled role of women, particularly those of young mothers. Her poem "In the Park" established a certain feminist reputation but others of her poems treat motherhood in a more complex and nuanced way. Music is another recurring motif. The Tasmanian landscape, and Aboriginal dispossession of that landscape, form another theme in much of her writing. She also wrote series of poems with recurring characters, two of the most notorious being Professor Eisenbart and Kröte. Many of her poems also include biblical references and religious allusions.

The style and technique of Harwood's poetry has led to several of her works being employed by the New South Wales Board of Studies as prescribed texts for the High School Certificate. Primary focus in the English course is placed on the analysis of the themes expressed in Harwood's poetry, and how such themes are relevant in modern society. Her work is also used as a text for the Victorian Certificate of Education and West Australian Certificate of Education Literature Courses in the poetry section for its literary value and complex themes.

Awards
 1959: Meanjin Poetry Prize
 1960: Meanjin Poetry Prize
 1975: Grace Leven Prize for Poetry
 1977: Robert Frost Medallion (now known as Christopher Brennan Award)
 1978: Patrick White Award
 1980: The Age Book of the Year Award and Non-fiction Award for Blessed City
 1988: University of Tasmania Honorary D.Litt.
 1989: Officer of the Order of Australia (AO)
 1989: Victorian Premier's Literary Award for Bone Scan
 1990: J. J. Bray Award
 1993: University of Queensland honorary doctorate
 1994: La Trobe University honorary doctorate
 2005: Tasmanian Honour Roll of Women inducted for service to the arts

Bibliography

Poetry
 Poems (1963)
 Poems Volume Two (1968)
 The Lion's Bride (1981)
 Bone Scan (1988)
 The Present Tense (1995)
 Gwen Harwood : Collected Poems, 1943–1995 (2003)

Letters
 Blessed City: Letters to Thomas Riddell 1943, ed. Alison Hoddinott (Angus & Robertson, 1990) 
 A Steady Storm of Correspondence: Selected Letters of Gwen Harwood 1943–1995, ed. Gregory Kratzmann (University of Queensland Press, 2001)

References

Further reading
 
 Strauss, Jennifer (1992) Boundary Conditions: The Poetry of Gwen Harwood (University of Queensland Press) 
 Trigg, Stephanie (1994) Gwen Harwood (Oxford University Press)

External links 
 An analysis of the writings of Gwen Harwood
 Useful links, trinity.wa.edu.au

1920 births
1995 deaths
Australian opera librettists
People from Brisbane
People from Hobart
Officers of the Order of Australia
Patrick White Award winners
Australian women poets
Australian women dramatists and playwrights
Women librettists
20th-century Australian women writers
20th-century Australian poets
20th-century Australian dramatists and playwrights